Amenhotep, son of Hapu (transcribed jmn-ḥtp zꜣ ḥꜣp.w;  early-mid 14th century BC) was an ancient Egyptian architect, a priest, a scribe, and a public official, who held a number of offices under Amenhotep III of the 18th Dynasty.

Life 
He is said to have been born at the end of Thutmose III's reign, in the town of Athribis (modern Banha in the north of Cairo). His father was Hapu, and his mother Itu. Though little about Amenhotep's early life is known prior to his entering civil service, it is believed that he learned to read and write at the local library and scriptorium. He was a priest and a Scribe of Recruits (organizing the labour and supplying the manpower for the Pharaoh's projects, both civilian and military). He was also an architect and supervised several building projects, among them Amenhotep III's mortuary temple at western Thebes, of which only two statues remain nowadays, known as the Colossi of Memnon, and the creation of the quarry of El-Gabal el-Ahmar, nearby Heliopolis, from which the blocks used to create the Colossi were probably taken. Other plans, such as the portico of the Temple of Karnak, completed under Ramesses II, and those for the Luxor Temple are also attributed to Amenhotep. He may also have been the architect of the Temple of Soleb in Nubia. Amenhotep is noted to have participated in Amenhotep III's first Sed festival, in the 30th year of the king's rule. After this, he is believed to have retired from civil service and become the steward of Princess Sitamun's properties (similar to an asset manager today), and received honours such as the designation of Fan-bearer on the Right Side of the King, among other things. According to some reliefs in the tomb of Ramose, he may have died in the 31st year of Amenhotep III, which would correspond to either 1360 BC or 1357 BC, depending on the chronology used. His death has also been dated to the 35th year of the king.

Legacy 
After his death, his reputation grew and he was revered for his teachings and as a philosopher. He was also revered as a healer and eventually worshipped as a god of healing, like his predecessor Imhotep (Amenhotep and Imhotep are among the few non-royal Egyptians who were deified after their death, and until the 21st century, they were thought to be only two commoners to achieve this status). There are several surviving statues of him as a scribe, portraying him as a young man and as an older man. He was a deified human and thus was depicted only in human form. His cult was initially limited to the Thebes area, with a funerary temple constructed to him during his lifetime next to that of Amenhotep III. This was clearly an exceptional privilege, as it was the only private cult temple to be built among the royal monuments in the area. He continued to be worshipped for at least three centuries after his death, and evidence of this worship persists in a 26th Dynasty votary inscription on a statue dedicated to Amenhotep by a daughter of the pharaoh. During the period of the Ptolemaic Kingdom, his worship saw a resurgence which led to chapels being dedicated to him in the Temple of Hathor at Deir el-Medina and the Mortuary Temple of Hatshepsut at Deir el-Bahari. Statues were erected to him in the Temple of Amun at Karnak and he was treated as an intermediary with the god Amun. Amenhotep also utilised his influence with the king to secure royal patronage for the town of Athribis, for the local god, and the temple dedicated to that god.

Manetho gives a legendary account of how Amenhotep advised a king named Amenophis, who was "desirous to become a spectator of the gods, as had Orus, one of his predecessors in that kingdom, desired the same before him". This Amenophis is commonly identified with Akhenaton also known as Amenhotep IV, while Orus fits with the latter's father, Amenhotep III. Manetho relates that the wise man counseled that the king should "clear the whole country of the lepers and of the other impure people" and that the King then sent 80,000 lepers to the quarries. After this the wise man foresaw that the lepers would ally themselves with people coming to their help and subdue Egypt. He put the prophecy into letter to the King and then killed himself. Manetho associates this event with the Exodus of the Israelites from Egypt, but Josephus strongly rejects this interpretation.

Mortuary temple
Amenhotep was allowed to build his mortuary temple adjacent to that of the pharaoh. This honour is quite rare and indicates that Amenhotep was highly respected by the time of his death, despite the fact that he was a commoner and had only entered civil service at an advanced age, in his late forties. Excavated in 1934 or 1935, it measures  metres and is surrounded by three shrines. His first courtyard contained a  water basin of considerable depth, fed by groundwater from the Nile. Twenty trees were planted in pits around the basin. The temple at the end of the courtyard was adorned with a pillared portico, and the temple was slightly elevated on a terrace.

See also
 List of Egyptian architects
 List of ancient Egyptian scribes

References

Further reading
J. H. Breasted, Ancient Records of Egypt, Part Two, 1906
Warren R. Dawson, Bridle of Pegasus, 1930, pp. 55ff.
Miriam Lichtheim, Ancient Egyptian Literature: A Book of Readings: The Late Period, 1980, University of California Press, Page 104
Siegfried Morenz, Egyptian Religion, 1992 Cornell University Press
Margaret Alice Murray, 1931, Egyptian Temples, 2002 Courier Dover Publications
Boyo Ockinga, Amenophis, Son of Hapu: A Biographical Sketch, The Rundle Foundation for Egyptian Archaeology Newsletter No. 18, February 1986

External links

Encyclopædia Britannica: Information on Amenhotep son of Hapu 
Inscriptions of Amenhotep, son of Hapu
Egyptian Museum of Cairo: Statue of Amenhotep son of Hapu

Officials of the Eighteenth Dynasty of Egypt
Ancient Egyptian architects
Ancient Egyptian priests
Ancient Egyptian scribes
Year of birth unknown
14th-century BC deaths
14th-century BC clergy
Deified Ancient Egyptian people
14th-century BC Egyptian people
Fan-bearer on the Right Side of the King